Kangaroo Point is a tiny suburb in southern Sydney, in the state of New South Wales, Australia. It is 22 kilometres south of the Sydney central business district in the local government area of the Sutherland Shire.

Kangaroo Point takes its name from the peninsula which sits on the southern bank of the Georges River. It is surrounded by the suburb of Sylvania which it was originally part of and still shares the same postcode. The suburbs of Kareela and Oyster Bay are located opposite the waterway of Oyster Bay. Blakehurst, Kyle Bay and Connells Point are located opposite the Georges River.

History
The traditional owners of Kangaroo Point peninsula are the Dharawal Aboriginal people and their archaeological heritage is evident on the peninsula with middens and rockshelters. After European settlement, the peninsula was acquired by John Connell Laycock as a Crown grant. Insurance broker Wynn Roberts took over in 1910 before it was subdivided in 1916. The area used to be regarded as part of Sylvania because it was mostly vacant bushland.

Population

Demographics
According to the 2016 census, there were 560 people usually resident in Kangaroo Point. 69.0% of people were born in Australia and 54.3% of people spoke only English at home. The most common responses for religion were Eastern Orthodox 25.1% and No Religion 21.8%.

Notable residents
 Angus Young, guitarist and founding member of AC/DC

References

Suburbs of Sydney
Sutherland Shire